Ankur Nayyar is an Indian television and film actor. He has worked in many shows like Kasautii Zindagii Kay, Kashmeer and Jeet. He is also known for playing the lead role of Samman Chaudhary in Sahara One's show Ghar Ek Sapnaa.

He was little seen in 2013–2014, but he returned in 2015 in Sony TV's show Bharat Ka Veer Putra – Maharana Pratap as Acharya Raghvendra. He was also seen as Coach Rajveer Rana in Meri Durga  and Tej Singh in Prem Ya Paheli - Chandrakanta. In July 2018, he went to play a cameo role of Mridul Rathod in Nazar (TV series). In 2018, he played the role of Randhir Ahluwalia in the Colors TV's popular show Tu Aashiqui. As of March 2019, he appeared in the Colors TV's historical drama Jhansi Ki Rani as Gangadas.

Career
His acting career took off, with the TV series Kashmeer, where he played the character of Aamir Bhatt, a parallel lead.

In 2014, Ankur joined the cast of Ek Boond Ishq as the parallel lead. He was also seen in Woh Rehne Waali Mehlon Ki, Yahaan Main Ghar Ghar Kheli and Maharana Pratap.

In 2017 he working on two shows - Meri Durga, where he essays the role of Coach Rana, and Prem Ya Paheli - Chandrakanta, where he plays Tej Singh. He recently finished his role as Humayun in Akbar. In 2018, he played the role of Randhir Ahluwalia in the Colors TV's popular show Tu Aashiqui. As of March 2019, he appeared in the Colors TV's historical drama Jhansi Ki Rani as Gangadas.

Personal life
Nayyar is married and has a daughter. 

He was born in Pathankot, Punjab, India.

Filmography

Films

Television

References

External links
 
 

Living people
Indian male soap opera actors
Male actors in Hindi cinema
Male actors in Hindi television
21st-century Indian male actors
Year of birth missing (living people)